Oh Baby is an American sitcom series that ran on Lifetime from August 26, 1998, to March 4, 2000, and from 1999 to 2003 on Canada's W Network. The series was produced by Mandalay Television for Columbia TriStar Television.

Oh Baby was based on the real-life experience of the show's executive producer Susan Beavers. The show's theme song was performed by Jimmy Beavers, Susan's brother.

GetTV announced at 6:30 PM on September 12, 2021, that Oh Baby will enter reruns and will aired on Mondays to Fridays on November 1, 2021.

Plot

The series follows Tracy Calloway, a single working woman who decides to have a child through artificial insemination, a decision that was spurred by an increase in working mothers at her workplace. Using a fourth wall technique, she tells the audience watching about the joy and sorrows of being a single mother while showing videos of her and her family and friends in her life.

As Tracy successfully goes through with the process, she eventually finds support in Dr. Charlotte St. John, her best friend—who also works at Tracy's company as a psychiatrist and can dole out advice on how to be a single mother (she was twice divorced and had two children with different fathers)—and in her brother Ernie, an aspiring painter who wants out of his marriage and to move to Europe.

The only person who initially has mixed feelings about Tracy's decision was her mother, Celia. At first, Celia thinks that Tracy has made the biggest mistake of her life by going through with the procedure, but eventually Celia comes to accept it. Despite that, Tracy knows her mother's reputation for trying to control her and Ernie's life, which indeed did play out through her pregnancy, with hilarious results.

Tracy's pregnancy also involves other situations which meet with hilarious results such as constant and uncontrollable water bursts and learning to breastfeed, including an incident when her lactating breast is accidentally exposed at a restaurant. Tracy also plays matchmaker for Charlotte, by hooking her up with her gynecologist Dr. Doug Bryan, leading to an on-again-off-again romance between the two.

By the end of the first season, Tracy gives birth to a son (a viewers' contest sponsored by Lifetime allowed fans to pick the baby's name). In August 1999, "Daniel" was the choice picked by viewers.

During the second season, Tracy finds herself trying to balance a life as a working mother as well as bearing Celia's constant interference, with disastrous results. That friction eventually also costs Tracy her job. As soon as she is let go, her fellow co-workers snatch everything from her cubicle.

Following that event, she and Charlotte decide to go into business for themselves by launching an online retail business called TrustMom.com whose logo is a picture of Celia, despite Tracy's objections.

Cast

Cynthia Stevenson (Tracy Callaway)
Joanna Gleason (Charlotte St. John) 
Jessica Walter (Celia Callaway)
Patrick Kerr (Brad)
Jack Coleman (Rick)
Matt Champagne (Ernie Callaway)
Ken Jenkins (Fred Calloway)
Tom Gallop (Jeff)
Justina Machado (Mona)

Julie Neumark (Teenage Tracy)
Lynnanne Zager (Newscaster)
Alison Martin (Nora)
Miles Grose (Customer Service Agent)
Mimi Rose (Frances)
Chad Everett (The Colonel)
Marley McClean (Molly)
Colin Spensor (Bradley)
Florence Stanley (Beverly)

Jeff Yagher (Noah)
Julie Bowen (Nikky)
Greg Evigan (Billy)
Eric Szmanda (Brent)
Steve Wilder (Vince)
Doug Ballard (Dr. Doug Bryan)
Don McManus (Don Lewis)
Cheyenne Haynes (Sara)

References

External links
 

Lifetime (TV network) original programming
1998 American television series debuts
1990s American workplace comedy television series
1990s American sitcoms
2000s American sitcoms
2000 American television series endings
2000s American workplace comedy television series
Metafictional television series
Pregnancy-themed television shows
Television series by Sony Pictures Television